The 1956 Women's World Chess Championship was won by Olga Rubtsova, who became the fourth women's champion.

The Candidates Tournament was won by Rubtsova. Instead of her playing the defending champion Elisabeth Bykova, however, FIDE decided that the championship would be decided between the top three female players: Rubtsova, Bykova, and Lyudmila Rudenko, ex-champion and loser of the last title match.

1955 Candidates Tournament

The Candidates Tournament was held in Moscow in October 1955. Rubtsova won narrowly, only half a point ahead of her closest competitor.

{| class="wikitable"
|+ 1955 Women's Candidates Tournament
|-
! !! Player !! 1 !! 2 !! 3 !! 4 !! 5 !! 6 !! 7 !! 8 !! 9 !! 10 !! 11 !! 12 !! 13 !! 14 !! 15 !! 16 !! 17 !! 18 !! 19 !! 20 !! Points !! Tie break
|- style="background:#cfc;"
| 1 ||  || - || 0 || 0 || 1 || ½ || ½ || 1 || 1 || ½ || ½ || 1 || 1 || 1 || 1 || 1 || 1 || 1 || 1 || 1 || 1 || 15 || 
|-
| 2 ||  || 1 || - || ½ || ½ || ½ || 1 || ½ || 1 || 1 || ½ || 1 || ½ || 1 || ½ || ½ || 1 || 1 || ½ || 1 || 1 || 14½ || 
|-
| 3 ||  || 1 || ½ || - || 1 || 1 || ½ || 0 || 1 || 0 || ½ || 1 || ½ || 1 || 0 || 1 || 1 || 1 || 1 || 1 || 1 || 14 || 
|-
| 4 ||  || 0 || ½ || 0 || - || 1 || 1 || 1 || 1 || 0 || 1 || ½ || 1 || 0 || 1 || ½ || 1 || 1 || 1 || 1 || 1 || 13½ || 
|-
| 5 ||  || ½ || ½ || 0 || 0 || - || 1 || ½ || 0 || ½ || ½ || ½ || 1 || 1 || 1 || 1 || 1 || 1 || 1 || 1 || 1 || 13 || 
|-
| 6 ||  || ½ || 0 || ½ || 0 || 0 || - || ½ || 0 || 1 || ½ || 1 || 1 || 1 || ½ || 1 || 1 || 1 || 1 || 1 || 1 || 12½ || 
|-
| 7 ||  || 0 || ½ || 1 || 0 || ½ || ½ || - || 0 || 0 || 1 || ½ || 1 || 1 || 1 || 1 || 0 || 1 || 1 || 1 || 1 || 12 || 
|-
| 8 ||  || 0 || 0 || 0 || 0 || 1 || 1 || 1 || - || 1 || ½ || ½ || 1 || 1 || 1 || 0 || 1 || ½ || 1 || ½ || ½ || 11½ || 
|-
| 9 ||  || ½ || 0 || 1 || 1 || ½ || 0 || 1 || 0 || - || ½ || ½ || 0 || 1 || 0 || 0 || 1 || 0 || 1 || 1 || 1 || 10 || 
|-
| 10 ||  || ½ || ½ || ½ || 0 || ½ || ½ || 0 || ½ || ½ || - || ½ || ½ || ½ || ½ || 1 || 1 || ½ || 1 || 0 || ½ || 9½ || 84.25
|-
| 11 ||  || 0 || 0 || 0 || ½ || ½ || 0 || ½ || ½ || ½ || ½ || - || ½ || ½ || 1 || ½ || 0 || 1 || 1 || 1 || 1 || 9½ || 70.50
|-
| 12 ||  || 0 || ½ || ½ || 0 || 0 || 0 || 0 || 0 || 1 || ½ || ½ || - || ½ || ½ || ½ || 1 || 1 || 1 || 1 || 1 || 9½ || 67.75
|-
| 13 ||  || 0 || 0 || 0 || 1 || 0 || 0 || 0 || 0 || 0 || ½ || ½ || ½ || - || 1 || 1 || 1 || 1 || 1 || 1 || 1 || 9½ || 63.75
|-
| 14 ||  || 0 || ½ || 1 || 0 || 0 || ½ || 0 || 0 || 1 || ½ || 0 || ½ || 0 || - || 1 || 0 || ½ || 0 || ½ || 1 || 7 || 
|-
| 15 ||  || 0 || ½ || 0 || ½ || 0 || 0 || 0 || 1 || 1 || 0 || ½ || ½ || 0 || 0 || - || 0 || ½ || 0 || 1 || 1 || 6½ || 53.75
|-
| 16 ||  || 0 || 0 || 0 || 0 || 0 || 0 || 1 || 0 || 0 || 0 || 1 || 0 || 0 || 1 || 1 || - || 0 || ½ || 1 || 1 || 6½ || 43.25
|-
| 17 ||  || 0 || 0 || 0 || 0 || 0 || 0 || 0 || ½ || 1 || ½ || 0 || 0 || 0 || ½ || ½ || 1 || - || 1 || 0 || ½ || 5½ || 
|-
| 18 ||  || 0 || ½ || 0 || 0 || 0 || 0 || 0 || 0 || 0 || 0 || 0 || 0 || 0 || 1 || 1 || ½ || 0 || - || 1 || ½ || 4½ || 
|-
| 19 ||  || 0 || 0 || 0 || 0 || 0 || 0 || 0 || ½ || 0 || 1 || 0 || 0 || 0 || ½ || 0 || 0 || 1 || 0 || - || 1 || 4 || 
|-
| 20 ||  || 0 || 0 || 0 || 0 || 0 || 0 || 0 || ½ || 0 || ½ || 0 || 0 || 0 || 0 || 0 || 0 || ½ || ½ || 0 || - || 2 || 
|}

1956 Championship Tournament

The championship tournament was held in Moscow in 1956. The three players each played 8-game mini-matches against each other, with Rubtsova eventually clinching the title.

{| class="wikitable"
|+ Women's World Championship Tournament 1956
|-
!  !! Player !! 1 !! 2 !! 3 !! Total
|- style="background:#cfc;"
| 1 || align=left| || - || 4½ || 5½ || 10
|-
| 2 || align=left| || 3½ || - || 6 || 9½
|-
| 3 || align=left| || 2½ || 2 || - || 4½
|}

References

Women's World Chess Championships
1956 in chess